Richard N. Gladstein (born June 4, 1961) is a two-time Academy Award nominated film producer. His production company is FilmColony. He served as the Dean of the American Film Institute Conservatory from 2017 to 2018.

Biography
Gladstein was born to an American Jewish family and received his bachelor's degree in film from Boston University's College of Communication. From 1993 through 1995, he served as executive vice president of production for Miramax Films after which he founded his own production company, FilmColony. His films include The Hateful Eight, Finding Neverland, The Bourne Identity, Pulp Fiction, She's All That, Reservoir Dogs, Hurlyburly, and The Cider House Rules. He received Academy Award nominations for both Finding Neverland (2004) and The Cider House Rules (2000). In 2000, his FilmColony company renewed a deal with Miramax.

Personal life
He founded The Bloom's Syndrome Foundation which is dedicated toward medical research on Bloom's Syndrome, an Ashkenazi Jewish genetic disease with which his son was diagnosed in 2004.

Filmography
He was a producer in all films unless otherwise noted.

Film

As an actor

As writer

Thanks

Television

Trivia

In a 1994 interview with Charlie Rose, Quentin Tarantino states that he owes his career to Gladstein.

References

External links

FilmColony.com

1961 births
Living people
American film producers
20th-century American Jews
Boston University College of Communication alumni
21st-century American Jews
American Ashkenazi Jews